Roxburgh refers to an ancient town and county in Scotland.

Roxburgh may also refer to:

Places
Roxburgh (village), Scottish Borders, close to the ancient town
Roxburghshire, former Scottish county
Roxburgh Castle, ruined castle near Roxburgh, Scotland
Roxburgh, New Zealand, a town in Otago
Roxburgh County, New South Wales, Australia
Roxburgh Park, Victoria, Australia

Electoral districts 

 Berwickshire, Roxburgh and Selkirk (UK Parliament constituency)
 Ettrick, Roxburgh and Berwickshire (Scottish Parliament constituency)
 Roxburgh and Berwickshire (UK Parliament constituency)
 Roxburgh and Berwickshire (Scottish Parliament constituency)
 Roxburgh, Selkirk and Peebles (UK Parliament constituency)
 Roxburgh and Selkirk (UK Parliament constituency)
 Roxburghshire (UK Parliament constituency)
 Roxburghshire (Parliament of Scotland constituency)

Other uses
Roxburgh (surname)
Duke of Roxburghe
HMS Roxburgh, Royal Navy cruiser

Different spelling 

 Claes Roxbergh (born 1945), Swedish politician

See also
Roxboro (disambiguation)
Roxborough (disambiguation)
Roxbury (disambiguation)
Roxburghshire